Uridine diphosphate glucose (uracil-diphosphate glucose, UDP-glucose) is a nucleotide sugar. It is involved in glycosyltransferase reactions in metabolism.

Functions
UDP-glucose is used in nucleotide sugar metabolism as an activated form of glucose, a substrate for enzymes called glucosyltransferases.

UDP-glucose is a precursor of glycogen and can be converted into UDP-galactose and UDP-glucuronic acid, which can then be used as substrates by the enzymes that make polysaccharides containing galactose and glucuronic acid.

UDP-glucose can also be used as a precursor of sucrose, lipopolysaccharides and glycosphingolipids.

Components
UDP-glucose consists of the pyrophosphate group, ribose, glucose, and uracil.

See also 
 DNA
 Nucleoside
 Nucleotide
 Oligonucleotide
 RNA
 TDP-glucose
 Uracil
 Uridine diphosphate

References

Nucleotides
Coenzymes